The 2016 UK & Ireland Greyhound Racing Year was the 91st year of greyhound racing in the United Kingdom and Ireland and commenced with the category 2 Coronation Cup at Romford Greyhound Stadium which was shown live on Sky Sports. The final event was the Olympic at Brighton & Hove Greyhound Stadium.

The year was overshadowed by the ongoing saga regarding the uncertain future of the Greyhound Racing Association operated tracks of Wimbledon Stadium and Hall Green Stadium. An announcement was made that Wimbledon would close after the running of the 2016 English Greyhound Derby before a six-month reprieve arrived. However it was announced that the stadium would close in March 2017.

Wimbledon's sister track Hall Green remained in danger of being closed following the 2014 sale to Euro Property Investments Ltd.

The premier competition of the year, the English Greyhound Derby, was won by Jaytee Jet  and the Irish Derby was taken by Rural Hawaii. Kevin Hutton secured his second successive trainers championship. Mark Wallis won the champion trainer trophy for a record eighth time passing the previous record of seven set by John 'Ginger' McGee Sr.

The year ended with two notable successes for Towcester, the first was being crowned BAGS/SIS Track Champions (greyhound racing's equivalent to footballs FA Cup and within days it was announced that the track would host the English Greyhound Derby for five years.

Roll of honour

Principal UK finals

Principal Irish finals

UK Category 1 & 2 competitions

Irish feature competitions

References 

Greyhound racing in the United Kingdom
Greyhound racing in the Republic of Ireland
2016 in British sport
2016 in Irish sport
UK and Ireland